Bella Joseph was the wife of Julius Joseph. The couple worked for  the United States Government. It is alleged that they also worked for Soviet Intelligence during World War II,  Bella in the Office of Strategic Services' Motion Picture Division.

Her alleged cover name in Soviet intelligence, and as deciphered in the Venona project, is "Colleague". Bella is also identified as "Colleague" in Weinstein and Vassiliev's, The Haunted Wood, a book based on Soviet archives..

Venona
Bella Joseph is referenced in the following Venona project decrypts:
880 KGB New York to Moscow, 8 June 1943, p.1
880 KGB New York to Moscow, 8 June 1943, p.2

References
Allen Weinstein and Alexander Vassiliev, The Haunted Wood: Soviet Espionage in America—the Stalin Era, New York: Random House (1999).
John Earl Haynes and Harvey Klehr, Venona: Decoding Soviet Espionage in America, New Haven: Yale University Press, (1999).

Possibly living people
Year of birth missing
American spies for the Soviet Union
American people in the Venona papers
People of the Office of Strategic Services